Jonathan Jackson (born September 2, 1977) is a former professional American football linebacker who played for the Kansas City Chiefs and the New Orleans Saints. He also played for the Las Vegas Outlaws of the defunct XFL.

High school
Jonathan attended Bonanza High School in the Las Vegas Valley. He was a two-year starter on the football team and also lettered in basketball.

College career
Jonathan attended Oregon State. He played 44 games in four years totaling 279 tackles, 4 sacks, 3 interceptions and 3 fumble recoveries. He received his degree in Business Administration.

Professional career
Jackson went undrafted in the 2000 NFL Draft. He was signed as an undrafted rookie free agent by the Kansas City Chiefs, but was released during training camp. Due to his ties with Las Vegas, the newly created Las Vegas Outlaws of the XFL drafted Jackson with the 332nd pick in the inaugural XFL Draft. On January 6, 2002, Jackson made his sole NFL appearance for the New Orleans Saints against the San Francisco 49ers in the final game of the 2001-02 regular season. During the 2002 season Jackson played for the Berlin Thunder in NFL Europe.

References

1977 births
Living people
African-American players of American football
Players of American football from Dayton, Ohio
Sportspeople from the Las Vegas Valley
American football linebackers
Oregon State Beavers football players
Kansas City Chiefs players
Las Vegas Outlaws (XFL) players
New Orleans Saints players
Berlin Thunder players
21st-century African-American sportspeople
20th-century African-American sportspeople